The 2004–05 NBA season was the Bulls' 39th season in the National Basketball Association. After the retirement of Scottie Pippen, the Bulls stumbled out of the gate as they lost their first nine games on their way to an awful 3–14 start. However, they would win 13 of their 16 games in January including a 7-game winning streak, then win nine straight games between March and April. The Bulls finished second in the Central Division with a record of 47–35, and qualified for the playoffs for the first time since 1998, when they last made the NBA Finals, as well as when they won their last NBA championship. Second-year star Kirk Hinrich averaged 15.7 points, 6.4 assists and 1.6 steals per game. Top draft pick Ben Gordon became the first rookie to win the Sixth Man of The Year Award, as he and Luol Deng were both selected to the All-Rookie First Team.

However, injuries were an issue as Deng was out for April and the postseason with a wrist injury, and Eddy Curry was sidelined due to a heart ailment. In the first round of the playoffs, the Bulls took a 2–0 lead over the Washington Wizards, but would lose the final four games of the series. Following the season, Curry and Antonio Davis were both traded to the New York Knicks.

This was the Bulls' first winning season and first playoff run since 1998, during the Michael Jordan era, when they won their sixth and most recent NBA championship.

For the season, they slightly changed their uniforms added the Bulls secondary logo on the back of the jersey. They remained in used until 2014.

Offseason

The Bulls drafted Ben Gordon, Chris Duhon, and getting  Luol Deng from a trade with the Phoenix Suns, with Gordon coming from Connecticut and Deng and Duhon coming from Duke. They also signed Argentinian forward Andrés Nocioni, who had played on several successful international teams. These acquisitions reflected John Paxson's strategy of building around players who had already been on successful teams, a departure from what Jerry Krause had done as General Manager, drafting Eddy Curry and Tyson Chandler in the same season, players who both showed tremendous potential, but were both coming to the NBA directly from high school.

Jamal Crawford and Jerome Williams were traded to the New York Knicks for Dikembe Mutombo and Cezary Trybanski. However, Mutombo was traded again to the Houston Rockets for Eric Piatkowski and Adrian Griffin without ever playing in a game for the Bulls and Trybanksi was waived by the team in October.

NBA Draft

Roster

Regular season

season standings

Schedule

Record vs. opponents

Playoffs
The Bulls' record of 47-35 was good enough for the #4 seed in the Eastern conference. In the first round of the playoffs the Bulls met another young team on the upswing, the Washington Wizards. The Bulls would lose the series 4-2, staying competitive throughout most of the series, but ultimately unable to find an answer for Wizards star Gilbert Arenas. The Bulls also entered the series nursing injuries. Most notably, Eddy Curry was injured in late March, and the Bulls signed veteran Lawrence Funderburke just days before the beginning of the postseason in an attempt to add more depth to their front-court.

|- align="center" bgcolor="#ccffcc"
| 1
| April 24
| Washington
| W 103–94
| Ben Gordon (30)
| Andrés Nocioni (18)
| Kirk Hinrich (7)
| United Center22,655
| 1–0
|- align="center" bgcolor="#ccffcc"
| 2
| April 27
| Washington
| W 113–103
| Kirk Hinrich (34)
| Chris Duhon (8)
| Chris Duhon (7)
| United Center22,605
| 2–0
|- align="center" bgcolor="#ffcccc"
| 3
| April 30
| @ Washington
| L 99–117
| Tyson Chandler (15)
| Antonio Davis (11)
| three players tied (4)
| MCI Center20,173
| 2–1
|- align="center" bgcolor="#ffcccc"
| 4
| May 2
| @ Washington
| L 99–106
| Hinrich, Pargo (18)
| Tyson Chandler (13)
| Gordon, Hinrich (5)
| MCI Center20,173
| 2–2
|- align="center" bgcolor="#ffcccc"
| 5
| May 4
| Washington
| L 110–112
| Ben Gordon (27)
| Tyson Chandler (10)
| Kirk Hinrich (7)
| United Center22,250
| 2–3
|- align="center" bgcolor="#ffcccc"
| 6
| May 6
| @ Washington
| L 91–94
| Hinrich, Nocioni (22)
| Tyson Chandler (11)
| Kirk Hinrich (9)
| MCI Center20,173
| 2–4
|-

Player statistics

Season

Playoffs

Awards and records
 Ben Gordon, NBA Sixth Man of the Year Award
 Ben Gordon, NBA All-Rookie Team 1st Team
 Luol Deng, NBA All-Rookie Team 1st Team

Ben Gordon lost out to Emeka Okafor for Rookie of the Year honors, but did win Sixth Man of the Year honors, averaging 15.1 points per game despite making only three starts.

Transactions
 June 24, 2004: Drafted G Ben Gordon in the 1st round (3rd overall) of the 2004 NBA Draft
 June 24, 2004: Drafted C Jackson Vroman in the 2nd round (31st overall) of the 2004 NBA Draft
 June 24, 2004: Drafted G Chris Duhon in the 2nd round (38th overall) of the 2004 NBA Draft
 June 24, 2004: Traded C Jackson Vroman, a future first round pick and cash to the Phoenix Suns for F Luol Deng
 August 5, 2004: Traded G Jamal Crawford and F Jerome Williams to the New York Knicks for C Dikembe Mutombo, F Othella Harrington, G Frank Williams and C Cezary Trybański
 August 11, 2004: Signed free agent F Andrés Nocioni
 August 20, 2004: Waived F Paul Shirley
 September 8, 2004: Traded C Dikembe Mutombo to the Houston Rockets for G Adrian Griffin, F Eric Piatkowski and G Mike Wilks
 September 30, 2004: Signed free agent C Jared Reiner
 October 4, 2004: Waived F Chris Jefferies
 October 5, 2004: Announced the retirement of F Scottie Pippen
 October 20, 2004: Waived G Mike Wilks
 October 28, 2004: Waived C Cezary Trybański
 November 1, 2004: Waived F Eddie Robinson
 January 5, 2005: Waived F Tommy Smith
 April 18, 2005: Signed F Lawrence Funderburke

References

Chicago Bulls seasons
Chicago
Chicago
Chicago